Giuseppe "Peppino" Impastato (January 5, 1948 – May 9, 1978), was an Italian political activist who opposed the Mafia, which ordered his murder in 1978.

Childhood

Giuseppe "Peppino" Impastato was born in Cinisi, in the then province of Palermo, into a Mafia family. His father  had been sent into internal exile during the fascist era, and was a close friend of Mafia boss Gaetano Badalamenti. His father's brother-in-law, Cesare Manzella, was an important Mafia boss who was killed in car bomb attack in 1963. As an adolescent, Peppino broke off relations with his father – who kicked him out of the house – and initiated a series of political and cultural antimafia activities.

According to his younger brother Giovanni Impastato, Peppino's antimafia activity might have been triggered by the brutal murder of his uncle by marriage, Cesare Manzella, who was blown to pieces by a car bomb in April 1963 when Peppino was fifteen years old. Pieces of his uncle – who was the Mafia boss of Cinisi at the time – were found stuck to lemon trees hundreds of meters from the crater where the car had been. Peppino was traumatized: "Is this really Mafia? If this is Mafia I will fight it for the rest of my life".

Political activist
In 1965 Peppino Impastato founded the newsletter L'idea socialista and joined the left-wing PSIUP party (Italian Socialist Party of Proletarian Unity). He took a leading role in the activities of the new revolutionary movements that sprung up in 1968. He led struggles by Cinisi peasants whose land had been expropriated to build the third runway at Palermo's Punta Raisi Airport, as well as disputes involving construction workers and the unemployed. In 1975 he set up Music and Culture with other young people in Cinisi. The group organised debates, film, theatre and music shows and started a self-financed radio station named Radio Aut in 1976.

Peppino Impastato used humor and satire as his weapon against the Mafia. In his popular daily radio programme Onda pazza (Crazy Wave) he mocked politicians and mafiosi alike. On a daily basis he exposed the crimes and dealings of mafiosi in Mafiopoli (Cinisi) and the activities of Tano Seduto (a pun on Toro Seduto, Sitting Bull), a thinly disguised pseudonym of Gaetano Badalamenti, the capomafia of Cinisi. Nevertheless, it was Peppino Impastato and his friends that were considered to be the real nuisance and 'undesirable elements' by the authorities in town, not the 'respected' men such as Badalamenti.

Peppino's brother Giovanni declared before the Italian Antimafia Commission: "It seemed that Badalamenti was well liked by the carabinieri as he was calm, reliable, and always liked a chat. It almost felt like he was doing them a favour in that nothing ever happened in Cinisi, it was a quiet little town. If anything, we were subversives who made nuisances of ourselves. This was what the carabinieri thought. When I had a chance to speak to one of them – something which didn't happen often because I didn't really trust them – I realised that it was a widely held belief that Tano Badalamenti was a gentleman and it was us who were the trouble-makers."  "I often used to see them walking arm in arm with Tano Badalamenti and his henchmen. You can't have faith in the institutions when you see the police arm in arm with mafiosi."

Impastato clearly understood the danger represented by Badalamenti, and Badalamenti clearly understood the danger of Peppino Impastato. Impastato's struggles were too public and determined for the Mafia to allow his tireless activities to continue. Apparently, his father tried to protect him but unfortunately he was killed in a car accident in 1977, which might have been a premeditated murder. Apparently, Badalamenti waited until after Impastato's father had died to give the order to kill Impastato.

Murder

In 1978 Peppino Impastato stood as a candidate in the Cinisi council elections for Proletarian Democracy (Democrazia proletaria). He was killed during the election campaign on the night of May 8–9, by a charge of TNT placed under his body, which had been stretched over the local railway line – a sinister twist of fate to the car-bomb that had killed his uncle and initiated Peppino's revolt against the Mafia. The same day Christian-Democrat former Prime Minister Aldo Moro's corpse was discovered on Via Caetani in Rome. Two days later voters in Cinisi elected him as a councillor.

Initially press, police and investigative magistrates considered that Peppino Impastato had been a left-wing terrorist who had tried to bomb a railway line, but caused his own death. After the discovery of a letter written by Impastato several months before his death, authorities started talking about suicide. Thanks to the efforts of his brother Giovanni Impastato, his mother Felicia Bartolotta Impastato (who publicly broke relations with their Mafia relatives), his fellow activists, and the Centro siciliano di documentazione (founded in Palermo in 1977; Giuseppe Impastato's name was added to its masthead in 1980), the Mafia's responsibility for the crime would be identified after a struggle of many years.

Following a statement made by a former member of the Cinisi Mafia, the pentito Salvatore Palazzolo who had turned state witness, and named Badalamenti as the instigator of the murder, the investigation was formally reopened in June 1996, and in November the following year an arrest warrant was issued for Badalamenti. In 1998 a committee was formed by the Italian Parliament's permanent Antimafia Commission to investigate the 'Impastato case'. On December 6, 2000, it issued a report which outlined the responsibilities of State officials in leading the investigations astray. On March 5, 2001, the Court of Assises declared Vito Palazzolo to be guilty of murder, initially handing down a thirty-year sentence, however, the Court later overturned his conviction. Gaetano Badalamenti was given a life sentence on April 11, 2002.

Peppino's mother, Felicia Bartolotta Impastato, reacted to the conviction in a very dignified manner: "I never have had any feelings of revenge. All I have done is call for justice for my son's death. I have to confess that, after so many years of waiting, I had lost faith; I never thought we would reach this point. Now I feel a great deal of contentment and of satisfaction. I always knew what had happened. Badalamenti used to call my husband Luigi to complain about Peppino, and my husband begged him not to kill the boy."

The epitaph engraved on Peppino's grave in Cinisi reads as follows: "Revolutionary and Communist militant - Murdered by the Christian-Democratic mafia".

In popular culture
In the 1994 Italian TV series La piovra, the character of Daniele Rannisi, a young man who disavows his family connection to the Mafia and starts a satirical pirate radio show denouncing their activities, was based on Impastato.
In 2000, the movie I cento passi, directed by Marco Tullio Giordana, was released about the life and death of Peppino Impastato. "I cento passi" (one hundred steps) was the distance between the Impastato's house and the house of Tano Badalamenti.
In 2004 the song "I cento passi" was released by Italian band "Modena City Ramblers" in the memory of Peppino Impastato.
The 2011 album La cretina commedia by Italian "ska" band "Talco" is a concept album about the life and work of Peppino Impastato.
In 2016 the movie Felicia Impastato in the memory of Peppino Impastato's mother for justice struggle in IMDB.
In 2018, the indie game 1977: Radio Aut was released, which is an interactive story chronicling Peppino Impastato's early life and his efforts to bring to light the harm caused by the Mafia and local corruption.

See also
 List of victims of the Sicilian Mafia
List of journalists killed in Europe

References

 Behan, Tom. Giuseppe Impastato: his actions, his murder, the investigation and the cover up, Palermo: Centro Siciliano di Documentazione "Giuseppe Impastato".
  Caso Impastato final report of the Italian parliamentary Antimafia Commission, December 6, 2000
 Dickie, John (2004). Cosa Nostra. A history of the Sicilian Mafia, London: Coronet, 
  Orioles, Riccardo, Morte di un siciliano, I Siciliani, maggio 1983

External links

  Giuseppe Impastato: l'attività, il delitto, l'inchiesta e il depistaggio Centro Siciliano di Documentazione "Giuseppe Impastato"
 Sicilian Centre of Documentation Giuseppe Impastato
 I cento passi (The Hundred Steps) movie about the life and death of Giuseppe Impastato.
  Peppino Impastato
  Giovanni Impastato: «Antenne, cavi, spinotti: così mio fratello Peppino sfidò don Tano Seduto», Corriere della Sera, March 8, 2007

1948 births
1978 deaths
Antimafia
Assassinated Italian journalists
Assassinated activists
Assassinated radio people
Italian communists
People murdered by the Sicilian Mafia
Politicians from the Province of Palermo
People murdered in Italy
20th-century Italian journalists
Italian male journalists